270 (two hundred [and] seventy) is the natural number following 269 and preceding 271.

In mathematics
270 is a harmonic divisor number
270 is the fourth number that is divisible by its average integer divisor
270 is a practical number, by the second definition
The sum of the coprime counts for the first 29 integers is 270
270 is a sparsely totient number, the largest integer with 72 as its totient
Given 6 elements, there are 270 square permutations
10! has 270 divisors
270 is a Harshad number in base 10
270 is the smallest positive integer that has divisors ending by digits 1, 2, ..., 9.
270 is the smallest sum of a set of even numbers that contain every digit once.

Integers from 271 to 279

271

272
272 = 24·17, sum of four consecutive primes (61 + 67 + 71 + 73), Euler number, primitive semiperfect number, pronic number. 272 is the smallest palindrome divisible by a fourth power.

273

274
274 = 2·137, tribonacci number, Smith number, nontotient, noncototient, centered triangular number, 27464 + 1 is prime

275
275 = 52·11. 275 is the sum of fifth powers of the first two primes. The maximal number of pieces that can be obtained by cutting an annulus with 22 cuts.

276

277

278
278 = 2·139 = Φ(30), nontotient. 278 is the smallest semiprime such that the next semiprime (287) is its anagram.

279
279 = 32·31. Every positive integer is the sum of at most 279 eighth powers. See Waring's problem.

References 

Integers